Epimorius maylinae is a species of snout moth in the genus Epimorius. It was described by Solis in 2003, and is known from Costa Rica.

References

Moths described in 2003
Endemic fauna of Costa Rica
Moths of Central America
Tirathabini